Callaway is a city in Bay County, Florida, United States, and is a suburb of Panama City.  The population was 14,405 at the 2010 census. It is part of the Panama City–Lynn Haven–Panama City Beach Metropolitan Statistical Area.

The first arrest for the sale to a minor of an explicit album (The 2 Live Crew Is What We Are) occurred in Calloway in April 1987, when a music-store clerk was charged with "sale of harmful material to a person under the age of 18," a third-degree felony. The clerk was later acquitted.

Geography

Demographics

At the 2010 census there were 14,405 people in 5,541 households, including 4,006 families, in the city. The population density was 2,503.5 inhabitants per square mile (965.8/km). There were 6,590 housing units at an average density of  1,598.9 per square mile (418.5/km). The racial makeup of the city was 71.1% White, 18.2% African American, 0.7% Native American, 4.1% Asian, 0.01% Native Hawaiians and 4.5% from two or more races. Hispanic or Latino of any race were 5.9%.

Of the 5,541 households 36.6% had children under the age of 18 living with them, 54.6% were married couples living together, 13.4% had a female householder with no husband present, and 27.7% were non-families. 22.1% of households were one person and 4.8% were one person aged 65 or older. The average household size was 2.57 and the average family size was 3.00.

The age distribution was 27.3% under the age of 18, 9.9% from 18 to 24, 31.6% from 25 to 44, 22.7% from 45 to 64, and 8.5% 65 or older. The median age was 34 years. For every 100 females, there were 99.8 males. For every 100 females age 18 and over, there were 96.1 males.

The median household income was $36,064 and the median family income  was $41,509. Males had a median income of $27,773 versus $20,324 for females. The per capita income for the city was $16,102. About 10.3% of families and 11.6% of the population were below the poverty line, including 18.2% of those under age 18 and 7.7% of those age 65 or over.

References

External links
 City of Callaway official website

Cities in Bay County, Florida
Populated places on the Intracoastal Waterway in Florida
Cities in Florida